The Brethren of the Long House is Riot's ninth studio album. It was first released in Japan on November 11, 1995, in Germany in 1996, and eventually in the United States in 1999. The album is dedicated to the lost culture of American Indians.

Track listing

Personnel

Band members 
 Mike DiMeo – lead and backing vocals, keyboards
 Mark Reale – guitars, backing vocals, producer
 Mike Flyntz – guitars
 Pete Perez – bass
 John Macaluso – drums, cover art

Additional musicians 
 Bobby Jarzombek – drums on tracks 1, 4, 12, 13, 14
 Steve Loeb – keyboards, strings, backing vocals, orchestration, producer
 Kevin Dunne, Phil Mangalanous, Steve Briody – strings, orchestration
 David L. Spier – trumpet

Production 
 Rod Hui – engineer, mixing, producer
 Danny Mardosky, Phil Painson, Joshua Wertheimer – engineers

References 

1996 albums
Riot V albums
Sony Music Entertainment Japan albums
Metal Blade Records albums